The 1965 NCAA University Division Wrestling Championships were the 35th NCAA University Division Wrestling Championships to be held. The University of Wyoming in Laramie, Wyoming hosted the tournament at War Memorial Fieldhouse.

Iowa State took home the team championship with 87 points and two individual champions. 

Yojiro Uetake of Oklahoma State was named the Most Outstanding Wrestler and Charles Tribble of Arizona State received the Gorriaran Award.

Team results

Individual finals

References
1965 NCAA Tournament Results

NCAA Division I Wrestling Championship
NCAA
Wrestling competitions in the United States
NCAA University Division Wrestling Championships
NCAA University Division Wrestling Championships
NCAA University Division Wrestling Championships